Kishwar Naheed (born 1940) is a feminist Urdu poet and a writer from Pakistan. She has written several poetry books. She has also received awards including Sitara-e-Imtiaz for her literary contribution towards Urdu literature.

Early life
Kishwar Naheed was born in 1940 to a Syed family in Bulandshahr, India. She migrated to Lahore, Pakistan after partition in 1949 with her family.  Kishwar was a witness to the violence (including rape and abduction of women) associated with the partition of India. The bloodshed at that time left a lasting impression on her at a tender age. As a young girl, Kishwar was inspired by the girls who had started going to Aligarh Muslim University in those times. The white kurta and white gharara under a black burqa that they wore looked so elegant to her and she wanted to go to college, to educate herself.

She finished Adeeb Fazil degree in Urdu and learned Persian language also. She had become a voracious reader in her teenage years and read everything that she chanced upon — ranging from the works of Dostoyevsky to the English dictionary published by Neval Kishore Press.

She struggled and fought to receive education, when women were not allowed to go to school.  She studied at home and received a high school diploma through correspondence courses. After matriculation, there was a lot of family resistance to her taking admission in college but her brother, Syed Iftikhar Zaidi, paid for her tuition and helped her continue her formal education. In Pakistan she went on to obtain Bachelor of Arts in 1959 and master's in economics in 1961 from Punjab University, Lahore. Kishwar married her friend and a poet Yousuf Kamran and the couple have two sons. After her husband's death, she worked to raise her children and support the family.

Career 
Kishwar Naheed has 12 volumes of her poetry published from both Pakistan and India. Her Urdu poetry has also been published in foreign languages all over the world. Her famous poem 'We Sinful Women', affectionately referred to as a women's anthem among Pakistani feminists, gave its title to a groundbreaking anthology of contemporary Urdu feminist poetry, translated and edited by Rukhsana Ahmad and published in London by The Women's Press in 1991.

Kishwar Naheed has also written eight books for children and has won the prestigious UNESCO award for children's literature. Her love for children is as much as her concern for women. She expresses this concern in her poem, Asin Burian We Loko, which is a touching focus on the plight of women in the present male-dominated society. Naheed has served major positions in various national institutions. She was Director General of  Pakistan National Council of the Arts before her retirement. She also edited a prestigious literary magazine Mahe Naw and founded an organisation Hawwa (Eve) whose goal is to help women without an independent income become financially independent through cottage industries and selling handicrafts.

Politics and Feminism
Kishwar Naheed has been witness to the struggles and aspirations that Pakistan has gone through as a nation. Her written work, spanning for more than four decades, chronicles her experiences as a woman writer engaged in the creative and civic arenas, even as she has dealt with personal, social, and official backlashes.

Months after the Partition of India – a little before her family moved to Lahore from Bulandshahr – Kishwar saw something which left a lasting impression on her mind and her heart. The pain and sadness she felt in those moments have stayed with her forever. Some Muslim girls who belonged to Bulandshahr were kidnapped during the Partition riots. Either they succeeded in running away from their captors or were rescued, they arrived back in Bulandshahr. Some were known to her family and she accompanied her mother and sisters to go see them. They looked haggard, exhausted and broken. Surrounded by other women who were trying to console them, they were all lying down on the floor or reclined against the walls in a large room. The feet of these women were badly bruised and soaked in blood. That was the moment when Kishwar Naheed says she stopped being just a child and became a girl child. She became a woman. She still remembers those blood soaked feet and says "women and girls anywhere have their feet soaked in blood. Very little has changed over the decades. This must end".

Influenced by the Progressive Writers' Movement in South Asia and the ideals of socialism, Kishwar Naheed witnessed major international political upheavals; Pakistan was under martial law and new ideas and forms were being introduced and appreciated in Urdu literature. Kishwar and her friends got involved in everything. One day they would take a procession out in support of Gamal Abdel Nasser and the Egyptian right over Suez Canal, the next day they would bring out a rally for Vietnam or Palestine or Latin America.

In an interview to the Pakistani monthly magazine, The Herald (Pakistan), Kishwar Naheed commenting on censorship says:

"we must not forget that creative writers and artists do not live in isolation. It is natural to react to and comment on the political and social circumstances in which one lives. On one hand, it is said that creative people are more sensitive and concerned while, on the other hand, it is argued that they must confine themselves to writing about themselves or their inner feelings. It is fine that we should write about our inner feelings but when Malala [Yousafzai] was shot or girl schools in Swat were being razed to the ground, it was my inner feeling that I wrote about. My poems will now be seen as a critical social comment and some may call these political poems but these poems represent my inner feelings......Creativity cannot be regulated nor should it be. Who would know this better than a woman writer or artist who has to struggle all her life to be able to express what she feels and thinks, to be able to articulate the way she wishes to articulate, to be able to present to the world what she wishes to present in her own unique way."

"This freedom to write and express has come through a struggle drenched in tears".

Kishwar Naheed also champions the cause of peace in South Asia and has played a significant role in promoting Pakistan India People's Forum and South Asian Association for Regional Cooperation (SAARC) Writers Forum. She has participated in global literary and cultural movements bringing together writers and artists who believe in a fair and equitable global political order. Her powerful poems against extremist religious thought, violence, terrorism and increased suffering of women and girls due to radicalization have created waves locally and internationally.

Literary Works 
Kishwar Naheed is widely acclaimed for her sharp and incisive poetic expression, for being bold and direct, and, for celebrating the universal human struggle for equality, justice and freedom. She also writes a regular weekly newspaper column in Daily Jang. Commentators and critics have noticed that, with time, her voice has grown "louder, more insistent and somehow more intimate". 

Her first poetry collection was Lab-e Goya, published in 1968, that won the Adamjee Literary Award.

Awards and recognition

See also 
 List of Pakistani poets
 List of Urdu language poets
 List of feminist poets

References

Further reading
 Jane Eldridge Miller, ed., Who's Who in Contemporary Women's Writing. 2001.

External links
 The South Asian Literary Recordings Project, Library of Congress

Urdu-language poets from Pakistan
Muhajir people
Pakistani poets
Pakistani feminist writers
1940 births
People from Bulandshahr
Living people
University of the Punjab alumni
Pakistani women writers
Recipients of the Adamjee Literary Award
Recipients of Sitara-i-Imtiaz